= WGPL, Lexington =

Neighborhood in Lexington, Kentucky

Coordinates: 38.014°N 84.519°W

WGPL is a neighborhood in southwestern Lexington, Kentucky, United States. Its name is an acronym for the main streets in the neighborhood - Wabash Drive, Goodrich Avenue, Pensacola Drive and Lackawanna Drive. It is located between Rosemont Garden, Southland Drive, Nicholasville Road, and the Norfolk Southern railroad tracks. WGPL is part of a larger neighborhood in Lexington called Pensacola Park, which includes Suburban Court, Rosemont Garden, and Penmoken Park, according to the Fayette County Property Value Administrator.

== Neighborhood statistics ==
- Area: 0.087 square miles (0.23 km^{2})
- Population: 334
- Population density: 3,839 people per square mile
- Median household income: $54,581
