= Penmoken Park, Lexington =

Neighborhood in Lexington, Kentucky

Coordinates: 38.017°N 84.519°W

Penmoken Park is a neighborhood in southwestern Lexington, Kentucky, United States. It is composed of a single street - Penmoken Park. It is bounded by Rosemont Garden to the north, Nicholasville Road to the east, and the Norfolk Southern railroad tracks to the west.

Neighborhood statistics

- Area: 0.031 square miles (0.080 km^{2})
- Population: 111
- Population density: 3,521 people per square mile
- Median household income: $54,581
